The Crabb Massacre was the culmination of the eight-day Battle of Caborca. It was fought between Mexico and their O'odham allies against irregular forces from the United States in April 1857. Due to the outbreak of the Reform War in Mexico between conservatives and liberals (1858-60), the rebel Ignacio Pesqueira invited the U.S. politician Henry A. Crabb to colonize the northern frontier region in the state of Sonora.  The colonists could help Pesqueira fight in the civil war and against the Apache. When Crabb arrived in Mexico, his command was attacked by liberal forces and ultimately defeated. Some 50 survivors of the battle, out of about 85 men, were executed by the Mexicans.

Background
The Reform War was a Mexican civil war, between Mexico's rival conservative and liberal factions. Ignacio Pesqueira fought for the liberals in Sonora, against the state soldiers of the conservative Governor Manuel María Gándara. General Crabb was a former State Senator from California, as well as a former United States Army officer, but his journey to Mexico in 1857, known as the Crabb Expedition, was of a private nature and did not involve the United States government or its military. In the fall of 1856, after Crabb's loss in an election to decide the next senator of California, he came into contact with Pesqueira through his Mexican wife.

Crabb accepted Pesqueira's offer which authorized the general to bring 1,000 colonists to Sonora. By the time the expedition left for Mexico, the general had recruited only about 100 men. Other volunteers organized to follow Crabb into Sonora either abandoned the march or were attacked by the Mexicans. Starting out from San Diego, California in January 1857, the expedition went to the Lower Colorado River and then entered New Mexico Territory, now Arizona, and headed directly for the Gila River where they gathered livestock for several weeks. The location of the camp is now known as the Filibusters Camp. In March they went south for the Tucson area to recruit more men. From Tucson the expedition continued further south to Altar, Sonora, where they met with Pesqueira and his rebels. By the time Crabb reached Sonora, the liberals had already defeated Gándara's conservative troops and forced him into exile. Gándara later sought refuge in Tucson.

Conflict
The Crabb expedition first made contact with the rebels at Caborca, having diverged from Altar, their original destination. Now that he no longer needed the colonists from the U.S., Pesqueira was criticized by his followers for accepting to use Americans in the war. Because of this, the liberals decided to destroy the expedition. Crabb sent the prefect of Altar a message saying that he had come in peace but the message was either ignored or failed to arrive in time to influence the situation. At Caborca the Americans became involved in a skirmish that took eight days to finish according to George N. Cardwell who wrote an account of the affair in a letter to his brother J. W. Cardwell.

Massacre
George Cardwell, an associate of some of the expedition's members, wrote that at the conclusion of the battle, in which 25 U.S. citizens were killed, the remaining 58 were separated into groups of ten and executed by firing squad. Crabb's men took up positions inside an adobe building but it was later set on fire by an O'odham warrior, forcing their surrender. Cardwell's letter says that 87 Americans were killed in all, including General Crabb, though other accounts say 77 Americans were killed in the massacre itself, not including those who died during the fighting. In Cardwell's letter, he includes a list of 55 of the Americans who died and says that among them were California's most respectable citizens. Cardwell wrote that the Mexicans lost 189 men out of about 1,200. This number included dozens of O'odham.

The Mexican commander, Hilario Gabilondo, who had received instructions from Pesqueira to shoot the prisoners, refused to carry out his orders and left with a fourteen-year-old American boy named Evans. Evans was raised by Gabilondo and later became a Mexican customs inspector at the international border with the United States.

General Crabb was allowed to write a letter to his wife before being executed by a firing squad of 100 men. After his execution, his head was cut off and preserved in a jar. The letter was given to one of two men who left the expedition before it crossed the international border between Arizona and Sonora. At the time the Crabb Expedition was regarded by many Mexicans and Americans as being an outfit of filibusters, organized to conquer Mexican territory, but it was sanctioned by the liberal government in Mexico, which eventually won the Reform War in 1861. Cardwell himself wrote that "Mr. Crabb left here about January last, ostensibly for the purpose of mining in the Gadsden purchase, and settling there; but really intending to conquer Sonora, and in process of time add it to the slave states."

Aftermath
The conflict was not over. Cardwell writes that "some days" after the Caborca affair, a group of 20 Mexicans crossed the border, from San Juan, into Arizona and captured four men of Crabb's party who were resting in a general store due to illness. These four were executed. Shortly thereafter, twenty of Crabb's volunteers launched an expedition to relieve General Crabb. Led by Major R. N. Wood and Captain Granville Henderson Oury of Tucson, the rescue party was on the Mexican side of the border when about 200 Mexicans attacked them near the location where the four sickly men had been captured. After "severe fighting", these twenty recruits successfully made it back across the border. A squad of sixteen other recruits was not so fortunate, and after crossing the border were intercepted by the same 200 men who had encountered Major Wood and Captain Oury. These men  surrendered without a fight but were executed like the others.

Of the Americans who participated in the Battle of Caborca, only one or two men survived, including the fourteen-year-old Evans. Accounts differ as to the existence of a second survivor. In California and New Mexico Territory, news of the massacre created a clamor for revenge against the Mexicans but the incident was eventually put aside and forgotten. Sometime later, Gabilondo, who had refused to kill the American colonists, was nearly lynched in Tucson by an angry mob, but survived apparently because of his innocence.

See also
 Goliad massacre
 Dawson massacre
 Mier expedition
 Republic of Sonora
 William Walker (filibuster)
 Capture of Tucson (1846)
 Crawford Affair
 Parker H. French

References

 

History of Arizona
History of Sonora
American frontier
Battles involving the United States
Battles involving Mexico
1857 in the United States
1857 in Mexico
Conflicts in 1857
Massacres in 1857
Massacres in Mexico
Arizona folklore
American filibusters (military)
19th-century military history of the United States
Tohono O'odham
Massacres by Native Americans
April 1857 events
Reform War
1857 murders in North America
1857 murders in Mexico